The 2016–17 season was the 114th in the history of the Southern League, which is an English football competition featuring semi-professional and amateur clubs from the South West, South Central and Midlands of England and South Wales. From the 2014–15 season onwards, the Southern League is known as Evo-Stik League Southern, following a sponsorship deal with Evo-Stik.

The league constitution was announced on 12 May 2016.

Premier Division

On 12 May 2016 the league constitution was announced. Later, Cinderford Town, who were originally promoted to the Southern Football League Premier Division as champions of Division One South & West, initially declined promotion due to financial concerns. On 27 May it was confirmed that Cinderford Town would remain in Division One South & West. As a consequence, the team with the best record among those relegated at level 7 - Stamford - were reprieved from relegation. Corby Town, who were originally placed in the Premier Division, were transferred to the Southern Football League to take the vacated place.

On 14 June 2016, Evesham United, who had been transferred from the Southern League Division One South & West to the Northern Premier League First Division South due to Cinderford's refusal to accept promotion, had an appeal against the decision to transfer them leagues heard by the Football Association. On 15 June 2016, they were informed they were successful in their appeal, meaning they would stay in their original league. The knock on effect of this was Cinderford Town were forced to take promotion to the Southern Football League Premier Division. This meant that Corby Town were placed back in the Northern Premier League Premier Division for the 2016-17 season.

The Premier Division consisted of 24 clubs, including 18 clubs from the previous season and six new clubs:
Two clubs promoted from Division One Central:
Kings Langley
St Ives Town

Two clubs promoted from Division One South & West:
Banbury United
Cinderford Town

Two clubs relegated from the National League South:
Basingstoke Town
Hayes & Yeading United

League table

Play-offs

Semi-finals

Final

Results

Stadia and locations

Division One Central

On 12 May 2016 the league constitution was announced. Three Division One Central clubs were moved to the parallel divisions: AFC Rushden & Diamonds were transferred to Northern Premier League Division One South, Godalming Town to Isthmian League Division One South and Ware to Isthmian League Division One North.

Division One Central consisted of 22 clubs, including 15 clubs from previous season and seven new clubs:
AFC Dunstable, promoted from the Spartan South Midlands League
AFC Kempston Rovers, promoted from the United Counties League
Ashford Town, promoted from the Combined Counties League
Farnborough, demoted from the Isthmian League Premier Division
Histon, relegated from the Premier Division
Kidlington, promoted from the Hellenic League
Marlow, transferred from Division One South & West

League table

Play-offs

Semi-finals

Final

Results

Stadia and locations

Division One South & West

On 12 May 2016 the league constitution was announced. One Division One South & West club were moved to the parallel division: Marlow were transferred to Division One Central. Later, Cinderford Town, who were originally promoted to the Premier Division as champions of Division One South & West, declined promotion due to financial concerns. On 27 May it was confirmed that Cinderford Town would remain in Division One South & West. As a consequence, Evesham United were transferred to the Northern Premier League Division One South to create a place for Cinderford Town.

On 14 June 2016, Evesham United, who had been transferred from the Southern League Division One South & West to the Northern Premier League First Division South due to Cinderford's refusal to accept promotion, had an appeal against the decision to transfer them leagues heard by the Football Association. On 15 June 2016, they were informed they were successful in their appeal, meaning they would stay in their original league. The knock on effect of this was Cinderford Town were forced to take promotion to the Southern Football League Premier Division.

Thus, Division One South & West featured five new clubs:
Barnstaple Town, promoted from the Western League
Bideford, relegated from the Premier Division
Hereford, promoted from the Midland League
Paulton Rovers, relegated from the Premier Division
Salisbury, promoted from the Wessex League

League table

Play-offs

Semi-finals

Final

Results

Stadia and locations

League Cup

The 2016–17 Southern League Cup (billed as The League Challenge Cup) was the 79th edition of the Southern League Cup, the cup competition of the Southern Football League.

1st round

2nd round

3rd round

Quarter-finals

Semi-finals

Final

See also
Southern Football League
2016–17 Isthmian League
2016–17 Northern Premier League

References

External links
Official website

Southern Football League seasons
7